Arga is a village in Uttara Kannada District, Karnataka, India. It lies south of Goa and borders the Arabian Sea.

In 2009 floods caused the villagers to leave their homes and seek shelter near the INS Kadamba naval base.

References

See also 
 INS Kadamba
 

Villages in Uttara Kannada district